Khurai railway station is a railway station in Khurai city of Madhya Pradesh. Its code is KYE. It serves Khurai city. The station consists of three platforms. Passenger, Express and Superfast trains halt here.

References

Railway stations in Sagar district
Jabalpur railway division